Eduardo Mendicutti (born March 24, 1948) is a Spanish writer and journalist. Mendicutti was ranked among the top 50 most influential gays in Spain.

Background 
Mendicutti was born in Sanlúcar de Barrameda, near  Cádiz, a province of Spain where he attended the Instituto Padre Luis Coloma de Jerez school. In 1972, Mendicutti moved to Madrid where he studied journalism and began writing for newspapers and magazines. Mendicutti had a column in the El Mundo, a daily newspaper since its foundation, wrote stories for the now defunct gay Zero and is currently a commentator on television. In 2014, El Mundo ranked him 28 in the most influential 50 gays in Spain saying he is very active in the gay movement. For his public activism, a plaza was built in his honor at his native city.

Mendicutti and Spanish writer Almudena Grandes, who died in 2021, were very good friends.

Works

Novels 

 Una mala noche la tiene cualquiera (1982)
 El salto del ángel (1985)
 Siete contra Georgia (1987)
 Tiempos mejores (1989)
 El palomo cojo (1991)
 Última conversación (1991)
 Los novios búlgaros (1993)
 Yo no tengo la culpa de haber nacido tan sexy (1997)
 El beso del cosaco (2000)
 El ángel descuidado (2002)
 Duelo en Marilyn City (2003)
 California (2005)
 Ganas de hablar (2008)
 Mae West y yo (2011)
 Otra vida para vivirla contigo (2013)
 Furias divinas (2016)
 Malandar (2018)
 Para que vuelvas hoy (2020)

Short stories 

 Fuego de marzo (1995).
 "Solamente una vez", in the anthology Tu piel en mi boca (2004).
 Pasiones fugaces (2004). 
 "Canela y oro", in the anthology Lo que no se dice (2014).

Chronicle 

 La Susi en el vestuario blanco (2003). Crónicas veraniegas publicadas en el diario El Mundo, corregidas y completadas.

Other 

 Testimonio en la antología Fobias. Diez escritores cuentan sus miedos (2002).

Awards
Mendicutti has received a number of awards for his works:
  1973 for Tatuaje
 Café Gijón 1974 for Cenizas
  1982 Short story award for Una mala noche la tiene cualquiera
  1984 Short story award for Última conversación
  1987 finalist for Siete contra Georgia
  1992 finalist for El palomo cojo
  2002 award for El ángel descuidado
 Nino Gennaro Award, 2012, from the Sicilia Queer filmfest
  2017

Film adaptions 

 El palomo cojo (1995), film directed by Jaime de Armiñán, adapted from novel by the same name.
 Bulgarian Lovers (2003), film directed by Eloy de la Iglesia, adapted from novel by the same name.

References 

21st-century Spanish writers
20th-century Spanish writers
1948 births
LGBT in Spain
Living people